Qu'aiti, or the Qu'aiti Sultanate of Shihr and Mukalla, was a sultanate in the Hadhramaut region of the southern Arabian Peninsula, in what is now Yemen. Its capital was Mukalla, and it was divided into six provinces including Al-Mukalla, Ash-Shihr, Shibam, Du'an, the Western Province and Hajr. Apart from Al-Mukalla, Ash-Shihr and Shibam were the Sultanate's major cities.

The Sultanate spanned the Indian Ocean coast up to the border of Mahra, encompassed Shabwa, the central valleys and oasis settlements of Hadhramaut, and controlled the southern Empty Quarter.

History

Sons of Umar bin Awadh al Qu'aiti, who became a jemadar in the forces of the Nizam of Hyderabad State (now in India), first took the town of Shibam from the rival Kathiris in 1858 to consolidate their rule over all of Hadhramaut.

In 1866, Sultan Ghalib bin Muhsin, Shaikh of the Kathiri, expelled Ali bin Naji from Shihr and took possession of the fort. At this time the inland town of Shibam was held by the Qu'aiti tribe. Qu'aiti Shaikh, Abdulla, being apprehensive that, the capture of Mukalla would follow that of Shihr, and that his communication with the seaboard would he cut off, applied to his brothers, in the service of the Hyderabad State, for assistance against Sultan Ghalib bin Muhsin. A request was thereupon preferred by the Minister of the Nizam for the armed interference of the British Government on behalf of the rightful Jemadar of Shihr. Government, however, declined to interfere or to allow an armed expedition to be fitted out by Arabs from the Indian coast.

In April 1867, Awadh (Nawaz) bin Umar, better known by his Hyderabad title of Sultan Nawaz Jang, a brother of the Qu'aiti Jemadar Abdulla, after establishing a blockade on the sea-coast, landed near Shihr, attacked and put to flight Sultan Ghalib bin Muhsin, and established the authority of his brother as Jemadar of Shihr. An attempt was made by the Kathiri Shaikh in December of the same year to retake the place, but he was repulsed by the Qu'aiti, who have since remained in unmolested possession of the port and district. Application was made by the Kathiri Shaikh to the British Government for permission to recover Shihr by force, but it was considered undesirable to interfere. At the same time the Nizam’s Minister declared his readiness to prohibit any interference on the part of Hyderabad subjects in the affairs of Hadramaut.

Salih bin Muhammad died in 1873, shortly after the conclusion of a treaty with him, by which he engaged for himself, his heirs and successors, to prohibit the import or export of slaves to or from Mukalla and its dependencies. He was succeeded as Naqib by his son, Umar bin Salih, who accepted an offer by the Qu'aiti Jemadar of Shihr to aid him in reducing the refractory Shaikh of Duan. Taking advantage of his admission with 600 followers into the fort of Mukalla, the Qu'aiti Jemadar demanded payment of a debt alleged to have been due to him by the late Naqib. Finding himself powerless to resist this demand, the Naqib consented to a treaty under which he agreed to cede half of Mukalla, of Bandar Burum, and of the district of Al-Harshiyyat in return for a payment of 2.5 lakhs of dollars, from which, however, the debt due to the Qu'aiti Jemadar was to be deducted. But hostilities continued; the Naqib entered into an alliance with the Kathiri, and the Qaiti, with the aid of their relatives at Hyderabad, purchased a vessel and dispatched her to Aden, There she was detained under the provisions of the Foreign Enlistment Act of 1870, and not released until the Qu'aiti Jemadar had bound himself under a heavy penalty to send her at once to Bombay without touching at, or undertaking any operations against, any of the ports of Hadhramaut. He further attempted to establish a blockade of Mukalla and hoarded native craft suspected of being bound for that port. For the plunder of three such vessels he was compelled to pay an indemnity of Rs. 6142 and warned of the consequences of such interference with commerce in the future.

In 1873, an engagement was concluded with the Jemadar of Shihr, by which he hound himself, his heirs and successors, to prohibit the import or export of slaves to or from Shihr and its dependencies.

The British Government steadily avoided interference or arbitration in the disputes between the Naqib of Mukalla and the Jemadar of Shihr, and took no action regarding them beyond asking for assurances from the ministers of the Hyderabad State that persons in the service of the Nizam, who might be convicted of taking part in the quarrel by supplying money and munitions of war to their relatives on either side, and so prolonging the strife, would be dismissed. But at length, in 1876, there being no prospect of the cessation of hostilities without some authoritative interference, the Political Resident at Aden, acting under the authority of Government, visited the two chiefs, and through his mediation a truce for two years was concluded, on the expiry of which period a further extension of one year was arranged. No permanent settlement was however effected, and eventually hostilities were resumed in 1880 and resulted in the capture of Burum by the Jemadar of Shihr. Being driven to extremities the Naqib of Mukalla signed the agreements drawn up by the Political Resident, and Burum was evacuated by the Jemadar of Shihr.

No sooner was the Naqib thus relieved from immediate pressure than he repudiated the terms of the settlement. The Government of India thereupon directed that the Jemadar should be replaced in possession of Burum, which was surrendered by the Naqib without further bloodshed. Finally, in November 1881, the latter gave himself up to the Commander of H. M. S. Dragon and was conveyed with his dependants to Aden, while the Jemadar of Shihr was put in possession of Muhalla and its dependencies. From Aden the Naqib went to Zanzibar with a number of Shaikhs and followers, and in 1888 he accepted the maintenance provided for him.

In 1882, an Engagement was concluded with the Jemadar of Shihr and Mukalla by which he became a British stipendiary, an allowance of 300 dollars a year being assigned to him, his heirs and successors. At the same time the Jemadar paid over a sum of 100,000 dollars to the Resident, at Aden for the maintenance of the Naqib of Mukalla.

On 1 May 1888, a Protectorate Treaty was concluded with the Jemadar Abdulla bin Umar, and his brother Awadh bin Umar.

Jemadar Abdulla bin Umar died on 25 November 1888, and Government sanctioned the continuance of the salute and stipend to his brother Awadh bin Umar (Sultan Nawaz Jang).

In 1896, a quarrel took place between Jemadar Awadh bin Umar and his nephews, Husein and Munassar, over their right of succession and the division of their properly. In September 1901, the Resident tried to bring about a settlement, but failed. A further conference at Aden in February 1902 was no more successful. Jemadar Awadh bin Umar went to India to lay his petition before the Viceroy, while his nephews returned to Shihr after signing a pledge not to interfere with the administration of their country. The agreement was broken, and in June the Resident, accompanied by Jemadar Awadh bin Umar, went to Shihr with an armed force. Husein submitted and was brought to Aden, Munassar following him shortly afterwards.

The settlement of the dispute between Awadh bin Umar and his nephews was then submitted to arbitration, which resulted in the award of a large sum of money to Husein and Munassar and their families. They, however, refused to accept the award and in July 1904 left for India and so far (December 1930) the dispute about the nephews’ Trust money has not been settled.

In 1902, a permanent salute of 9 guns was sanctioned for the Jemadar of Shihr and Mukalla, and his title was changed from Jemadar to Sultan.

At the end of 1904, the Sultan purchased a share in the port of Balahaf from the Wahidi Sultan Salih bin Abdulla, but Government refused to sanction the agreement.

In 1906, the Sultan’s nephew Munassar, writing to report the death of his brother Husein, unsuccessfully endeavoured to re-open the question of his differences with the Sultan.

In the Qaiti-Wahidi Agreement of 1910, the Wahidi Sultan allowed passage through his territory to the Sultan of Shihr and Mukalla.

In December 1910, Sultan Awadh bin Umar died, leaving a will nominating his oldest son Ghalib as his successor and directing that Ghalib’s successor was to be his brother Umar bin Awadh, to whom Ghalib bin Awadh’s son Salih has to succeed, and so on, the succession alternating between the families of his two sons Ghalib bin Awadli and Umar bin Awadh. In accordance with the terms of this will Ghalib succeeded as Sultan of Shihr and Mukalla, and the stipend paid to his father was continued to him.

In 1916, the Sultan sent to Aden his minister Khan Bahadur Sayyid Husein bin Hamid el Mehdar to discuss the question of his suzerainty over the Hadhramaut. Sayyid Husein produced a draft agreement in regard to the future status and administration of Balahaf and the other Wahidi territories, which the Sultan proposed to sign with the Sultan of Balahaf and his brothers, subject to the approval of Government. Sayyid Husein asserted that the Sultan had concluded agreements with certain tribes of the Hadhramaut, of which he was anxious to obtain Government recognition: and asked that, in the event of this being accorded, the tribes should not be allowed direct intercourse with the Aden Residency. The Government of India explained that, though they had no desire to raise any objection to the agreement which the Sultan had arrived at with Sultan Muhsin and his brothers, they preferred to defer their decision with regard to this, as well as the other agreements with the inland tribes, until normal conditions were established.

Sultan Ghalib died at Hyderabad in June 1922, leaving a will by which he nominated his son Salih as his successor.

Salih at first claimed the succession, but finally came in an agreement with his uncle in accordance with the terms of his grandfather’s will by which Umar bin Awadh was to succeed as Sultan of Shiihr and Mukalla while acknowledging Salih bin Ghalib as his heir.

In 1923, the succession of Sultan Umar was recognized by the British government, and the payment of the monthly stipend of 30 dollars was continued to him. In the same year he was granted a personal salute of 11 guns.

In 1931, the Sultan’s tribesmen, including Bedouins, numbered about 60,000, and his gross annual revenue was estimated at Rs. 6,25,000.

As Great Britain planned for the eventual independence of South Arabia in the 1960s, Qu'aitis declined to join the British-sponsored Federation of South Arabia but remained under British protection as part of the Protectorate of South Arabia. Despite promises of a UN referendum to assist in determining the future of the Qu'aiti State in South Arabia on 17 September 1967, communist forces overran the kingdom and, in November of that year, the Qu'aiti State was integrated forcibly without a referendum into communist South Yemen. South Yemen united with North Yemen in 1990 to become the Republic of Yemen.

Current Qu'aiti Royal Family
His Highness (HH) Sultan Ghalib II bin Awadh bin Saleh Al-Qu'aiti born 7 January 1948 in London. Ruled from 10 October 1966 – 17 September 1967; HH Sultan Ghalib holds a BA and MA from Magdalen College at the University of Oxford in Oriental Studies (Islamic History) and an MA in Arabian Studies from the University of Cambridge, both with honours. The Sultan graduated from Millfield School. He has been a Saudi resident since 1968, currently residing in Jeddah. He has working knowledge of seven languages including Arabic, English, French, German, Persian, Turkish and Urdu/Hindi, which supports his research of various historical periods and geographic regions.  Sultan Ghalib is the author of The Holy Cities, The Pilgrimage and The World of Islam  and The Three Saudi States: The Emergence of Modern Saudi Arabia. Married Sultana Rashid (sister of author Ahmed Rashid and aunt of Mishal Husain) born in London and who holds a BA from the University of Oxford, a MA from the University of Cambridge and has issue:
HH Crown Prince Saleh Al-Qu'aiti born in London, graduated from the Royal Military Academy Sandhurst and Millfield School; married Princess Salwa Al-Huraiby of Yafa'a and has issue: 
 Prince Ghalib III bin Saleh
 Princess Aliya bint Saleh
HH Princess Fatima Al-Qu'aiti born in London, holds a BA and a MA from the University of Oxford, graduated from Westonbirt School and attended Harvard University; married Prince Shad Al-Sherif Pasha, who holds a BA from the University of Oxford, Wheaton College (Massachusetts), a MA from the University of Chicago, an MBA from London Business School, graduated from Westminster School and has issue:
 Prince Suleyman
 Prince Hashim
HH Princess Muzna Al-Qu'aiti born in Jeddah, Saudi Arabia, holds a MA from the School of Oriental and African Studies, University of London and a BA from the American University in Cairo; married Hisham Hafez of Medina who holds a BA from the University of Richmond.  Hisham is the son of media mogul Mohammed Ali Hafez, founder of Asharq Al-Awsat, Arab News and Sayidaty, the Middle East's leading weekly women's magazine and has issue:
 Prince Ismail
 Princess Sultana
 Princess Asma

Qu'aiti sultans

 HH Jemadar/Sultan Abdullah bin Omar Al-Quaiti  – Ruled as Jemadar of Shihr 1867–1882, then as Sultan Nawaz Jang of Shihr and Mukalla 1882–1888
 HH Sultan Awadh I bin Omar Al-Qu'aiti – Ruled 1902–1909 (after 14 years of a dynastic crisis of succession)
 HH Sultan Ghalib I bin Awadh Al-Qu'aiti – Ruled 1909–1922
 HH Sultan Omar bin Awadh Al-Qu'aiti – Ruled 1922–1936
 HH Sultan Sir Saleh bin Ghalib Al-Qu'aiti KCMG - Ruled 1936-1956
 HH Sultan Awadh II bin Saleh Al-Qu'aiti – Ruled 1956–1966, married (1st) Salma, married (2nd) Fatima, married (3rd) Sahibzadi Nazirunissa Begum, granddaughter of the 6th Nizam Mahbub Ali Pasha, daughter of Nawab Nazir Nawaz Jung Bahadur, son of the Amir-e-Paigah (Viqar-ul-Umrah) and Sahibzadi Dawoodunissa Begum and had issue:
 HH Sultan Ghalib II bin Awadh Al-Qu'aiti (see above "Current Qu'aiti Royal Family") - Ruled until 1967
Princess Saleha bint Awadh Al-Qu'aiti
Prince Omar bin Awadh Al-Qu'aiti married and has issue: 
Prince Hussain bin Omar
Prince Mohammed bin Omar
Princess Noor bint Omar
Princess Maha bint Omar
Princess Sara bint Omar
Princess Leila bint Omar 
Princess Ghada bint Omar

See also
 Hadhramaut
 Aden Protectorate
 List of Sunni Muslim dynasties

Annexes

Qu'aiti State postage stamps

Notes

References

External links
 Official Website of the Al-Qu'aiti Royal Family
 Qu'aiti State flag
 Qu'aiti Genealogy and Flag
 History of the Holy Cities, The Pilgrimage and The World of Islam
 Arabian Days and Nights

History of Yemen
1967 disestablishments
Former countries in the Middle East
Sultanates
Protectorate of South Arabia
Former sultanates